Johnson Singh (born 10 November 1999) is an Indian cricketer. He made his List A debut on 28 September 2019, for Manipur in the 2019–20 Vijay Hazare Trophy. He made his Twenty20 debut on 8 November 2019, for Manipur in the 2019–20 Syed Mushtaq Ali Trophy. He made his first-class debut on 17 February 2022, for Manipur in the 2021–22 Ranji Trophy.

References

External links
 

1999 births
Living people
Indian cricketers
Manipur cricketers
Place of birth missing (living people)